West Boylston Middle/High School is a public high school located in West Boylston, Massachusetts, United States. In the 2012 rankings of U.S. News & World Report Best High Schools, West Boylston Middle/High School ranked at #41 within Massachusetts. The school serves grades 6-12 with a student to teacher ratio of 13:1.

Academics 

The curriculum at West Boylston Middle/High School is designed to meet the future career goals of the student, with all major courses categorized as AP, Honors, College Prep, or Individualized Program (IP).  The school uses a Weighted Class Rank System to determine class rank and G.P.A.

Students are tested via the Massachusetts Comprehensive Assessment System, according to the Massachusetts Department of Elementary and Secondary Education.

The following Advanced Placement courses are offered:
 
AP English Language & Composition
AP English Literature
AP Biology
AP Chemistry
AP Physics
AP US History
AP World History
AP Calculus

Anti-bullying policies 
The school was noted by People magazine for its decade old zero-tolerance bullying policy following a bully related tragedy in a nearby town. A peer advocates class is an integral part of the school's fight against bullying. Classified as a part-time health class for juniors and seniors, the students each "adopt" a student in a lower grade. Following 10 hours of training the students meet daily with the little brother or sister. The West Boylston Middle/High School's Day for Change is a daylong event held in April and December for freshmen and the 8th grade respectively. Events include the Power Shuffle, an exercise aimed at building trust and underscoring camaraderie among students.

Clubs and extracurricular activities 

The school offers a comprehensive program of clubs and activities for students.

Anime club - Membership open to grades 8-12. The club is devoted to the study of Japanese anime.

DECA Business club - Student run club offering business and leadership competitions.

Dickinson's Ribbons - High school literary magazine. Students gather and review short stories, essays, poems and artwork, with collections published up to twice per year.

Drama club - Open to all students, the club produces a full-length play each December.

GSA (Gay/Straight Alliance) - School based support group that includes students and teacher advisers. Focus is on encouraging understanding from students and faculty and on planning activities to foster tolerance and acceptance.

Helping PAWS - The club aids and supports locals shelters in finding homes for animals.

International Thespian Society - Troupe #6514 of the international organization. Membership is by invitation and based on commitment to the theater program, character and scholarship.

Mathematics Team - The Freshman team is open to students from grades 6-9. The Varsity team is open to all high school students.

National Art Honor Society -  Membership is based on achievement in art, character, scholarship, and requires a minimum of 5 hours of community service.

National French Honor Society - Chapter #3687. Membership is based on general scholarship and honors level achievement in French courses. Students in grades 10-12 are eligible.

National Honor Society - Students in grades 10 or 11 with a GPA of 3.95 or higher are invited to apply.

National Spanish Honor Society - Chapter name is La Giralda. Membership is based on general scholarship and honors level achievement in Spanish courses. Students in grades 10-12 are eligible.

Ski and Snowboard club - A six-week program for beginners to experienced skiers or boarders. Open to grades 6-12 students not already participating in school winter sports programs.

Student council - Student governing body with members elected by classmates or appointed as delegates by the executive board. The school's organization is one of the most active in the state, having received awards from the Massachusetts Association of Student Councils and the National Association of Student Councils. Several members have attended conferences on regional, state, and national levels to increase performance within the school community.

 Tri-M Music Honor Society - National honor society open to grades 10-12 who have achieved an A− in music and met other general requirements.

Yearbook - Committee to produce the high school and middle school yearbooks.

Athletics 

West Boylston Middle/High School offers sports programs throughout the school year. The fall sports season includes Golf, Soccer, Cheerleading, Football, and Field Hockey. Winter brings Cheerleading, Boys and Girls Basketball and the Ski Club. Spring sports offerings are Baseball, Softball, Tennis and Track.

Super Bowl Championship wins 

The West Boylston/Tahanto Regional High School football team won the 2012 Massachusetts Division 5 Super Bowl, defeating Leicester, 14-6. The Lions finished the season with a 12-1 record, the most wins by a football team in the school's history. The final game was played at  Worcester State University's John F. Coughlin Field.

Baseball State Championship appearance 

The West Boylston High School baseball team reached the State Championship game in 2009. The team entered the game as the Central Mass Division 3 Champion with a record of 24-0. The team would go on to lose the championship game 10-5 in extra innings to Abington High School.

References

External links 

Public high schools in Massachusetts
Public middle schools in Massachusetts
Schools in Worcester County, Massachusetts